Midway is an unincorporated community in Lee County, Arkansas, United States.

References

Unincorporated communities in Lee County, Arkansas
Unincorporated communities in Arkansas